Vincenzo Damista (born 7 June 1963) is an Italian sprint canoeist who competed in the mid-1980s. He did not finish in the repechages of the K-4 1000 m event at the 1984 Summer Olympics in Los Angeles.

References
Sports-Reference.com profile

External links
 

1963 births
Canoeists at the 1984 Summer Olympics
Italian male canoeists
Living people
Olympic canoeists of Italy
Place of birth missing (living people)
20th-century Italian people